Kirsanov is a military air base of the Russian Air Force in Tambov Oblast, Russia.

References
RussianAirFields.com

Soviet Air Force bases